Ngobi is a surname. Notable people with the surname include:

 Frederick Ngobi Gume, Ugandan politician
 Terisa Ngobi, New Zealand politician

See also
 Ngoni people
 Ngobin

Surnames of African origin